is Japanese manga series which was serialized in 1991 by Shogakukan. in the shōjo manga magazine Ciao. A 47-episode anime television series based on the manga was produced by NAS and TV Tokyo and animated by Studio Comet; it aired on TV Tokyo from 1996 to 1997. During the run of the anime a continuation of the story called "Shin Mizuiro Jidai" was run in Ciao Magazine. The series was made into a musical in 2001 and a cast recording was released.

Plot
The story of the anime follows Yuko Kawai, a junior highschool student, as she faces the challenges of growing up and overcoming her shyness as she comes of age. She begins seeing her best friend Hiroshi Naganuma, the boy next door, in a different light.

Characters
 

The main character in the story.
 

A childhood friend of Yuko Kawai who has a crush on her. When he confessed to her, at first he didn't get a straight answer. 
 

A friend of Yuko Kawai and a classmate. She has a pretty strong will and had a crush on Hiroshi Naganuma.

Episodes

References

External links
 
 

1991 manga
1996 anime television series debuts
1997 Japanese television series endings
2001 musicals
Drama anime and manga
Musicals based on anime and manga
Romance anime and manga
Shogakukan manga
Shōjo manga
TV Tokyo original programming